Giovanni Alejandro Sequeira Solano (born 27 April 1975) is a Costa Rican retired international footballer who played as a striker.

Club career
Sequeira began his professional career in 1995 with Saprissa, and has played in Costa Rica for Santa Bárbara, Cartaginés, Brujas and Carmelita, in Guatemala for Cobán Imperial, in the United States for the Tampa Bay Mutiny and the San Jose Clash, in Greece for Proodeftiki and in El Salvador for Águila.

He returned to Saprissa in January 2010 and joined Orión Desamparados in May 2011 to finish his career there in July 2011.

With Saprissa, he became the league's goalscorer of the 2010 Verano season. He had already scored his 100th Costa Rica Primera División goal a year before, when with Ramonense and ended up with 130 goals.

International career
Sequeira made his senior debut for Costa Rica in a January 1999 friendly match against Ecuador and earned his second and final cap 10 years later with a September 2009 FIFA World Cup qualification match against El Salvador.

Personal life
Sequeira is married to Mileska Marín and they have two sons, Alejandro and Sebastián. In 2006, he overcame alcoholism after his wife threatened to divorce him.

His brother Douglas Sequeira also played for the national team.

References

External links

 Nacion profile

1975 births
Living people
Association football forwards
Costa Rican footballers
Costa Rica international footballers
Deportivo Saprissa players
Cobán Imperial players
Tampa Bay Mutiny players
San Jose Earthquakes players
Proodeftiki F.C. players
C.D. Águila footballers
C.S. Cartaginés players
A.D. Carmelita footballers
Brujas FC players
A.D. Ramonense players
Costa Rican expatriate footballers
Expatriate footballers in Guatemala
Expatriate soccer players in the United States
Expatriate footballers in Greece
Expatriate footballers in El Salvador
Major League Soccer players